Intelligence QTL1 is a protein that in humans is encoded by the INTLQ1 gene.

References